Cao Zhongrong (Chinese: 曹忠荣, Cáo Zhōngróng; born 3 November 1981 in Shanghai) is a male Chinese modern pentathlete who competed in the 2008 and 2012 Summer Olympics.  He finished in 30th place in 2008, and won the silver medal in 2012.

His personal best is coming in 1st at the 2006 World Cup and 1st at the 2010 Asian Games.

References 
 profile
 China wins at Modern Pentathlon World Cup (photos attached)
 BEIJING 2008 OLYMPIC GAMES CHINESE SPORTS DELEGATION ROSTER 
 

1981 births
Living people
Chinese male modern pentathletes
Modern pentathletes at the 2008 Summer Olympics
Modern pentathletes at the 2012 Summer Olympics
Olympic modern pentathletes of China
Sportspeople from Shanghai
Olympic silver medalists for China
Olympic medalists in modern pentathlon
Asian Games medalists in modern pentathlon
Medalists at the 2012 Summer Olympics
Modern pentathletes at the 2002 Asian Games
Modern pentathletes at the 2010 Asian Games
World Modern Pentathlon Championships medalists
Asian Games gold medalists for China
Asian Games silver medalists for China
Medalists at the 2002 Asian Games
Medalists at the 2010 Asian Games
Modern pentathletes at the 2016 Summer Olympics
20th-century Chinese people
21st-century Chinese people